Amy Eliza Tanner (March 21, 1870 – February 1, 1956) was an American psychologist who became well known for discrediting the then-famous medium Leonora Piper after Tanner was allowed to attend six séances with a fellow researcher.

Biography
Tanner was born in Owatonna, Minnesota. She earned a doctoral degree in philosophy from the University of Chicago in 1898, finishing magna cum laude. Following her graduation from the University of Chicago, and unable to find employment elsewhere, she worked as an associate at the university's philosophy department. Four years later, she became a professor of philosophy at Wilson College in Chambersburg, Pennsylvania.

Although she had earned her Ph.D. in philosophy, her interests and her work led her to psychology and social psychology. Her unpublished dissertation was titled Association of Ideas: A Preliminary Study, and she published her subsequent research in psychology journals.

In 1907, Tanner became an "Honorary University Fellow" at Clark University, a position she held until 1916.  While at Clark University, she investigated mediumship with the psychologist G. Stanley Hall. She published her findings as sole author in the book Studies in Spiritism (1910) which documented the tests she and Hall had carried out in the séance sittings held with the medium Leonora Piper. Hall and Tanner had proven by tests that the "personalities" of Piper were fictitious creations and not discarnate spirits.

She left Clark (and academic work) in 1919, and remained in Worcester, Massachusetts. She was the director of the Worcester Girls Club for many years and represented the local Woman's Club on the Worcester Censorship Board. She purchased the Majestic Theater in Worcester in 1919 and operated it for a few years. She died February 1, 1956.

Selected publications
 
 
 
 
 
 
 
 "Association of Ideas: A Preliminary Study." Unpublished doctoral dissertation, University of Chicago, Chicago. (1900)

References

Further reading
 
 
Psychological Bulletin: An Illustration of the Psychology of Belief by Amy E. Tanner, February 15, 1907.

1870 births
1956 deaths
American women psychologists
20th-century American psychologists
Anomalistic psychology
American women writers
American skeptics
Clark University alumni
Critics of parapsychology
University of Chicago alumni
Wilson College (Pennsylvania) faculty
People from Owatonna, Minnesota
American women academics
Critics of Spiritualism